{{Album ratings
| rev1 = Allmusic
| rev1score =  <ref>{{AllMusic|class=album|id=r109428 |label="Sergio Mendes & Brasil '77: Ye-Me-Le" |first=Richard S |last=Ginell |accessdate=31 August 2011}}</ref>
}}Ye-Me-Lê'' is the sixth album by Sérgio Mendes and Brasil '66.

Track listing
 "Wichita Lineman" (Jimmy Webb)  (2:48)
 "Norwegian Wood" (John Lennon, Paul McCartney)  (3:53)
 "Some Time Ago"	(Sergio Mihanovich)  (2:24)
 "Moanin'"  (Bobby Timmons)  (3:05)
 "Look Who's Mine"  (Marcos Valle, Paulo Sérgio Valle, Alan Bergman, Marilyn Bergman)  (3:35)
 "Ye-Me-Lê"  (Luis Carlos Vinhas, Chico Feitosa)  (2:27)
 "Easy To Be Hard"  (James Rado, Gerome Ragni, Galt McDermot)  (2:45)
 "Where Are You Coming From?"  (Dori Caymmi, Nelson Motta, Lani Hall)  (4:05)
 "Masquerade"  (Leonard Haynes / Ron Rose)  (3:37)
 "What the World Needs Now" (Burt Bacharach, Hal David)  (2:14)

References

1969 albums
Sérgio Mendes albums
A&M Records albums
Albums produced by Sérgio Mendes